Keys to the VIP (A Professional League for Players) was a reality-television, comedy game show that aired on the Comedy Network and Fuse TV. The game involved two self-proclaimed players competing against each other to pick up women in a real bar. The two contestants went against each other in rounds to complete different objectives all related to seducing women. Hidden cameras recorded all the action that occurred, with four "expert" pick up artists judging to decide which of the two contestants did better picking up women during a round. The winner was the contestant that wins at least two out of the three rounds, and went on to win a party in a private VIP room with a select group of friends.

Hosts / Judges
The 4 hosts who oversaw the progress of the contestants across the town in Kai Lounge. Their personalities descend from the 4 corners of the male psyche.

Alen (Alen Bubuch) - The cold, calculated master of pick-up analysis
Peachez (Emeka Bronson) - An ex-all-star jock inspired seduction specialist
Sheldon - Mysteriously coy and unorthodox philosopher
Chris (Chris Greidanus) - A hopelessly romantic man of integrity

The roles are based on the real-life personalities of the four guys, but are exaggerated to help them come up with specific judging criteria.

Production Team
 Executive Producer - Sean Buckley
 Executive Producer - Alen Bubich
 Co-Executive Producer - Justin Killion
 Senior Producer - Jim Kiriakakis
 Director - Justin Harding

History
Alen, Peachez, Sheldon, Chris, and director Justin Harding are the creators of the show. The concept was based on the real-life challenges that Alen, Peachez, and Sheldon would come up with and try out in clubs in Guelph, Canada.  Most of the challenges from the show are challenges that the guys had attempted in real life; in fact, the three men came up with many more challenges that the network did not integrate into the show.   The pilot was filmed a few years before the show aired.  

Chris was originally in an editing role, and expected to continue this role for the network show. However, the executive producer steered him towards the role of the 'nice guy' on the judging panel. Chris describes being the only "genuine guy" to audition, and he won the role.

Filming Location
Episodes of Keys to the VIP were primarily filmed at well-known nightclubs and bars in the Greater Toronto Area. Some of the clubs included Mink, Zu bar and Wet bar.

Episode list

Season 1 Episode 4 had no declared winner. "That Guy" was randomly selected from the studio.
Season 2 of Keys to the VIP Premiered November 1, 2007 on The Comedy Network.
Season 3 of Keys to the VIP Premiered Thursday October 23, 2008 on The Comedy Network featuring the youngest contender on Keys to the VIP ever, 19-year-old Julian.
"That Guy" appears once again in Season 3 Episode 6, as the judges refused to choose a winner.
Season 3 Episode 1 had a resulting tie game - both players received the award.
Season 3 finale, also known as Redemption, featured four of the best previous contenders who didn't win. This episode was structured as an elimination tournament.

Games

See also
The Pick-up Artist
Blind Date
Pickup Artist

References

External links
Keys to the VIP Site
 

2006 Canadian television series debuts
CTV Comedy Channel original programming
Seduction
Television series by Entertainment One
2000s Canadian comedy television series